John Beers (born 17 August 1952) is a Canadian athlete. He competed in the men's high jump at the 1972 Summer Olympics.

References

1952 births
Living people
Athletes (track and field) at the 1972 Summer Olympics
Athletes (track and field) at the 1974 British Commonwealth Games
Commonwealth Games competitors for Canada
Canadian male high jumpers
Olympic track and field athletes of Canada
Place of birth missing (living people)
Athletes (track and field) at the 1975 Pan American Games
Pan American Games medalists in athletics (track and field)
Pan American Games silver medalists for Canada
Medalists at the 1975 Pan American Games
20th-century Canadian people
21st-century Canadian people